Miyuji is an administrative ward in the Dodoma Urban district of the Dodoma Region of Tanzania. In 2016 the Tanzania National Bureau of Statistics report there were 16,264 people in the ward, from 14,965 in 2012.

References

Wards of Dodoma Region